Marie Immaculée Ingabire is a Rwandan feminist and human rights activist, a dedicated gender and social justice advocate who has spent all her career in advancing women's rights in Rwanda and in the Region.
She has led Rwandan delegations and represented Rwandan in different high level forum and movement such as the Fourth World Conference on Women 1995 in Beijing and the International Conference on the Great Lakes Region, where she was the chairperson of the Regional Women Forum.

She has been at the forefront of establishing many women lead organizations such as PROFEMME TWESE HAMWE, HAGURUKA, and Rwanda Women Network and is currently the chair person of the Rwandan National chapter of Transparency International where she is working in the prevention and reporting corruption.

Career 
She was a journalist at the Office Rwandase de l’information. She is currently the chairperson of Transparency International Rwanda.

Awards 
Under her leadership, Transparency International Rwanda was voted best organisation to come up with initiatives that promote good governance in the country in 2012, an award issued by the Rwanda Governance Board (RGB).

External links 
 Ingabire Immaculée yavuze ko hari ingo zirutwa na gereza. Article by Ernest Nsanzimana from 8 January 2018 at umuryango.rw

References 

Living people
Rwandan women's rights activists
Year of birth missing (living people)